The Man Who Dared may refer to:

The Man Who Dared (1920 film), American drama directed by Emmett J, Flynn
The Man Who Dared (1933 film), American drama directed by Hamilton MacFadden
The Man Who Dared (1939 film), American crime drama directed by Crane Wilbur
The Man Who Dared (1946 film), American crime drama directed by John Sturges